Top-seed Chris Evert-Lloyd won the title for the sixth time, beating fourth-seed Andrea Jaeger in the final for a first-prize of $30,000.

Seeds
The eight seeds received a bye into the second round. A champion seed is indicated in bold text while text in italics indicates the round in which that seed was eliminated.

  Chris Evert-Lloyd (champion)
  Evonne Cawley (semifinals)
  Virginia Ruzici (third round)
  Andrea Jaeger (final)
  Regina Maršíková (quarterfinals)
  Ivanna Madruga (semifinals)
  Mima Jaušovec (withdrew — arm injury) 
  Laura duPont (second round)

Draw

Finals

Top half

Section 1

Section 2

Bottom half

Section 3

Section 4

References

External links

U.S. Clay Court Championships
1980 U.S. Clay Court Championships